Węgry may refer to:

Polish name for Hungary
Węgry, Lower Silesian Voivodeship (south-west Poland)
Węgry, Greater Poland Voivodeship (west-central Poland)
Węgry, Opole Voivodeship (south-west Poland)
Węgry, Pomeranian Voivodeship (north Poland)

See also
 Węgrów (disambiguation)